Conmany B. Wesseh is an Liberian politician and former activist.

Conmany Wesseh studied at the University of Liberia, and was a member of the Movement for Justice in Africa (MOJA) during the 1979 Rice Riots, in which MOJA played a key role. During the Liberian Civil War, Wesseh worked with Amos Sawyer as executive director and co-founder of the Center for Democratic Empowerment. After the war, he joined Ellen Johnson Sirleaf's Unity Party. Sirleaf appointed him to several positions within her government, including Ambassador to the United Nations. He ran for the Liberian Senate in 2005, 2009, and 2011, losing each time. However, he won his 2014 campaign for senate with 26.1% of the vote. His home county of River Gee's Legislative Caucus indefinitely suspended Wesseh's membership in the caucus in 2018. Although Wesseh is indefinitely suspended from the caucus, he has retained his position as senator.

References 

Unity Party (Liberia) politicians
Members of the Senate of Liberia
Living people
University of Liberia alumni
Year of birth missing (living people)
Place of birth missing (living people)
21st-century Liberian politicians